Point Arena Light is a lighthouse in Mendocino County, California, United States, two miles (3 km) north of Point Arena, California. The lighthouse features a small museum and gift shop. Guided tours of the light station as well as self-guided tours of the grounds are available daily.

Geography
The first European to record Point Arena was Spaniard Bartolomé Ferrer in 1543, who named it Cabo de Fortunas ("cape of fortunes"). in 1775, lieutenant Juan Francisco de la Bodega y Quadra (commander of the schooner Sonora) renamed the cape Punta Delgado ("narrow point") during a royal expedition chartered by the Viceroyalty of New Spain to map the north coast of Alta California. Later the point and the small harbor town south of it were called Barra de Arena ("sandbar") and finally Point Arena ("sand point"). Point Arena is a narrow peninsula jutting about 1/2 mile (800 m) into the Pacific Ocean. This sandbar creates a natural hazard to navigation, hence the need for a lighthouse and fog signal.

The first lighthouse

The lighthouse at this site was constructed in 1870. The brick-and-mortar tower included ornate iron balcony supports and a large keeper residence with enough space to house several families. In April 1906, the San Francisco earthquake struck the light station. The keeper's residence and lighthouse were damaged so severely that they had to be demolished.

The rebuilding

The United States Lighthouse Board contracted with a San Francisco-based company to build a new lighthouse on the site and specified that it had to withstand earthquakes. The company chose normally built factory smokestacks, which accounts for the final design for the new Point Arena Lighthouse, featuring steel reinforcement rods encased in concrete. This was the first lighthouse built this way.

The new lighthouse began operation in 1908, nearly 18 months after the quake. The lens was made up of 666 hand-ground glass prisms, all focused toward three sets of double bullseyes. These bullseyes gave Point Arena Lighthouse its unique "light signature" of two flashes every six seconds. The optics, which held an appraised value of over $3.5 million, were set in solid brass framework and built in France.

The light

Before the introduction of electricity, the lens was rotated by a clockwork mechanism. The keepers, or "wickies", hand-cranked a 160-pound weight up the lighthouse's center shaft every 75 minutes to keep the lens turning. Light was produced by a "Funck" hydraulic oil lamp that needed to be refueled every four hours and whose wicks had to be trimmed regularly. Later, two 1,000-watt electric lamps were installed to replace the oil lamp, and a  horsepower electric motor was installed to replace the clockworks.

Modernization

In 1978, the station's original fog signal was silenced and a bell buoy was placed nearby. June 1977 brought the installation of an automated aircraft-type beacon on the balcony tower, and the historic 1st Order Fresnel Lens was discontinued. At the time, the lens was the only mercury-floated light still in existence in the Twelfth United States Coast Guard District. The 400-pound aircraft beacon had been replaced by a 40-pound modern rotating light that incorporates the Fresnel principles for the efficient projection of light.

Reliability
A battery-powered emergency system is installed as a backup in the event of a power failure. In addition, a radio beacon, with a  signal that originates from the station, assists mariners.

Staffing
Four men staffed this family station and were provided with quarters as follows: one 4-bedroom unit and three 3-bedroom units. Other buildings are the light tower, paint locker, fuel locker, bosun locker and buildings housing the fire pump, water pumps and JP-5 fueling pumps. The station had a half-ton pickup truck assigned which, among other things, was utilized to transport dependent schoolchildren to school  from the station.

Today
In 1984, a nonprofit organization called the Point Arena Lighthouse Keepers acquired the light station as part of a 25-year land lease from the Coast Guard and the Department of Transportation. In November 2000, the nonprofit group became the official owners of the property due to its diligent historic preservation and educational efforts. Daily visitation, gift store sales, memberships and the rental of the historic keepers' homes on the property as vacation houses all provide income to the group for ongoing preservation, facility upgrades, and educational endeavors.

The Point Arena Light is California Historical Landmark No. 1035.

In popular culture
The final scenes of the Mel Gibson movie Forever Young (1992) were filmed near the lighthouse. The lighthouse also appears in the 2014 movie Need for Speed, as the finishing point of the De Leon underground supercar race that forms the climax of the film.

Marine Protected Areas
The Point Arena State Marine Reserve & Point Arena State Marine Conservation Area are two marine protected areas that extend offshore from Point Arena. Sea Lion Cove State Marine Conservation Area and Saunders Reef State Marine Conservation Area lie south of Point Arena. Like underwater parks, these marine protected areas help conserve ocean wildlife and marine ecosystems.

See also

List of lighthouses in the United States

References

External links

Live Webcams at Point Arena Light

California Historical Landmarks
Lighthouses completed in 1870
Lighthouses completed in 1908
Lighthouses on the National Register of Historic Places in California
Historic districts on the National Register of Historic Places in California
National Register of Historic Places in Mendocino County, California
1870 establishments in California